Luciene Ferreira da Silva (born 12 February 1985) is a Brazilian road and track cyclist. She participated at the 2011 UCI Road World Championships, and is a four-time national champion; winning the Brazilian National Time Trial Championships in 2011 and 2012, and the Brazilian National Road Race Championships in 2012 and 2013.

Major results
Source: 

2005
 1st Prova Ciclística 9 de Julho
 National Road Championships
2nd Road race
2nd Time trial
2006
 2nd Time trial, National Road Championships
2007
 1st Prova Ciclística 9 de Julho
 3rd Road race, National Road Championships
 5th Copa América de Ciclismo
2008
 2nd Road race, National Road Championships
2011
 National Road Championships
1st  Time trial
3rd Road race
2012
 National Road Championships
1st  Road race
1st  Time trial
2013
 1st  Road race, National Road Championships
 5th Time trial, Pan American Road Championships
2014
 6th Overall Tour Femenino de San Luis
2015
 2nd Road race, National Road Championships
 2nd Gran Prix San Luis Femenino
2021
 3rd Team pursuit, National Track Championships

References

External links

1985 births
Living people
Brazilian female cyclists
Brazilian road racing cyclists
Brazilian track cyclists
Sportspeople from Mato Grosso do Sul
21st-century Brazilian women